Kemacher is a summit of the Nordkette (North Chain) range in the Austrian state of Tyrol.

Climbing 
The Kemacher is the highest peak of the Innsbruck Via Ferrata and is typically reached from the top station of the Innsbruck Nordkettenbahn (North Chain Cable Car) at the Hafelekar in about 2.5 hours.

References 

Mountains of the Alps
Two-thousanders of Austria
Mountains of Tyrol (state)